The 2022 Brazilian Jiu-Jitsu European Championship, officially called the 2022 European Jiu-Jitsu IBJFF Championship, was an international jiu-jitsu event organised by the International Brazilian Jiu-Jitsu Federation (IBJFF) held between 15 and 20 February 2022 in Rome, Italy.

Location 
Rome was selected as the host city for the first time as the European championship had been previously held, until 2019, in Lisbon, Portugal.

Men's medallists 
Adult male black belt results

Women's medallists 
Adult female black belt results

Teams results 
Results by Academy

See also 
Asian IBJJF Jiu-Jitsu Championship
European IBJJF Jiu-Jitsu Championship
Pan IBJJF Jiu-Jitsu Championship
World IBJJF Jiu-Jitsu Championship

Notes

References 

Brazilian jiu-jitsu competitions
Brazilian jiu-jitsu European Championship
Brazilian jiu-jitsu European Championship
Brazilian Jiu-Jitsu in Italy
International sports competitions hosted by Italy
Sports competitions in Rome
European Championship
Brazilian jiu-jitsu competitions in Italy
European Jiu-Jitsu Championship